Spring Hill Township is one of seven townships in Johnson County, Kansas, USA. As of the 2010 census, its population was 7,496.

Adjacent Townships
 Olathe Township North
 Gardner Township West

Emergency Services

Police
 Spring Hill Police

Fire
 Spring Hill Fire

Medical (EMS)
 Olathe Medical Center
 Miami County Medical Clinic

Transportation

Major highways

School districts
 Olathe School District #233
 Spring Hill School District #230

External links

Townships in Johnson County, Kansas
Townships in Kansas